Peşrev (pronounced  in Turkish), Pişrev, peshrev, or pishrev; called bashraf بشرف in Arabic; is an instrumental form in Turkish classical music. It is the name of the first piece of music played during a group performance called a fasıl. It also serves as the penultimate piece of the Mevlevi ayini, ritual music of the Mevlevi order, under the name son peşrev (final peşrev), preceding son semai. It usually uses long rhythm cycles, stretching over many measures as opposed to the simpler usul the other major form of instrumental music uses, saz semai.

Along with the saz semai (called sama'i in Arabic), it was introduced into Arabic music in the 19th century, and became particularly popular in Egypt.

Etymology
In Ottoman Turkish, it was a Persian loanword composed of the particles pīš, which means "before, ahead", and rev, "that which goes". coming to mean "that which comes first". In Persian, however, the word پیشرو (pronounced: pi:ʃrow) is used in a different context, meaning "forerunner, "pioneer" or simply "forward". It is however noteworthy that notwithstandig the different pronunciation the term پیشرو was adopted into Ottoman Turkish with its Persian spelling. As for a Persian equivalent of the Ottoman Turkish loanword, the word   pišdaramad is used instead of پیشرو in order to denote the first piece of a traditional music performance or even a classical prelude or overture.

Structure 
Peşrevs are composed of movements called hane  (lit. "house"), at the end of which there is always an unchanging particle introducing the teslim  (lit. "handing in")  mülazime  (lit. "that which is inseparable or constant"), i.e. the refrain. Peşrevs are named after the makam used in the first hane and usually end with this makam; in Turkish classical music theory, they are said to be "bound" to this makam. There are always modulations to other makams in the hanes that follow the first hane, but with the refrain (teslim), the piece always regains the principal mode. At the end of each hane, a pause is made on the strong degree of its makam, forming a semi-cadence. This is called a yarım karar or nim karar (lit. "semi-decision"). Peşrevs usually have 4 hanes, yet they occasionally have 2, 5 or 6.

In principle, they comport rather large usuls, yet peşrevs with shorter rhythmical patterns do exist. One rule that is never ever transgressed is that this usul may not be a compound meter of the family aksak. Some peşrevs, called batak or karabatak are so organized as to instigate a form of question and answer between instruments.

If the hanes are to be marked with [A, C, D, E] and the teslim with [B], the regular structure of a peşrev would be A+B/C+B/D+B/E+B, thus always ending with the teslim. For some, the teslim is also the first hane; therefore they have the structure: A/B+A/C+A/D+A.

Peşrev composers in Ottoman classical music 
Tanburi Büyük Osman Bey was a prominent peşrev composer. Other composers include Tanburi Cemil Bey, Gazi Giray Han, Dimitrie Cantemir and Dilhayat Kalfa.

References 

Turkish music
Arabic music
Classical and art music traditions
Musical forms
Forms of Turkish makam music
Forms of Ottoman classical music